Obrad Sretenović (2 September 1935 – 14 January 2015) was a Croatian boxer. He competed in the men's heavyweight event at the 1960 Summer Olympics.

References

External links
 

1935 births
2015 deaths
Croatian male boxers
Olympic boxers of Yugoslavia
Boxers at the 1960 Summer Olympics
People from Požega-Slavonia County
Heavyweight boxers